Microbacterium populi is a Gram-positive, non-spore-formin and aerobic bacterium from the genus Microbacterium which has been isolated from the bark of Populus × euramericana.

References 

Bacteria described in 2015
populi